The 1994–95 NBA season was the Jazz's 21st season in the National Basketball Association, and 16th season in Salt Lake City, Utah. During the off-season, the Jazz signed free agent Antoine Carr, and acquired Adam Keefe from the Atlanta Hawks. The Jazz struggled losing four of their first six games, but then won seven of their next eight games, then won eight straight games in December. The team posted a 14–1 record in January, which included a 14-game winning streak which ended in early February, as the Jazz held a 35–13 record at the All-Star break. At midseason, the team traded Jay Humphries to the Boston Celtics in exchange for former Jazz guard Blue Edwards. The Jazz posted a nine-game winning streak between February and March, then won their final seven games of the season, finishing second in the Midwest Division with a 60–22 record. They made their 12th consecutive trip to the playoffs.

In a year of milestones, John Stockton became the NBA's all-time assist leader passing Magic Johnson with 9,921 on his way to a record tying eighth straight assist title. Meanwhile, Karl Malone and Tom Chambers both passed the 20,000 point mark in their careers. Malone averaged 26.7 points and 10.6 rebounds per game, while Stockton averaged 14.7 points, 12.3 assists and 2.4 steals per game. Malone and Stockton were both named to the All-NBA First Team, and selected for the 1995 NBA All-Star Game, while Stockton was named to the NBA All-Defensive Second Team, and Malone finished in third place in Most Valuable Player voting, while Stockton finished in eighth place. In addition, Jeff Hornacek finished second on the team in scoring averaging 16.5 points per game, while David Benoit provided the team with 10.4 points and 5.2 rebounds per game, and Felton Spencer provided with 9.3 points and 7.6 rebounds per game, but only played just 34 games due to an Achilles tendon injury.

In the Western Conference First Round of the playoffs, the Jazz took a 2–1 series lead over the 6th-seeded and defending champion Houston Rockets, but went on to lose the series in five games. The Rockets would go on to defeat the Orlando Magic in four straight games in the NBA Finals, winning their second consecutive championship.

Following the season, Chambers left to play in Israel, and Edwards left in the 1995 NBA Expansion Draft.

Draft picks

Roster

Regular season

Season standings

Record vs. opponents

Game log

Regular season

|- align="center" bgcolor="#ffcccc"
| 28
| December 30, 19947:00p.m. MST
| Houston
| L 103–111
| Malone (25)
| Malone (14)
| Stockton (16)
| Delta Center19,911
| 19–9

|- align="center" bgcolor="#ffcccc"
| 45
| February 2, 19956:30p.m. MST
| @ Houston
| L 101–121
| Malone (26)
| Malone (10)
| Stockton (5)
| The Summit16,611
| 34–11
|- align="center"
|colspan="9" bgcolor="#bbcaff"|All-Star Break
|- style="background:#cfc;"
|- bgcolor="#bbffbb"

|- align="center" bgcolor="#ccffcc"
| 68
| March 23, 19956:30p.m. MST
| @ Houston
| W 112–104
| Malone (30)
| Malone (15)
| Stockton (16)
| The Summit16,611
| 50–18

|- align="center" bgcolor="#ccffcc"
| 80
| April 19, 19957:00p.m. MDT
| Houston
| W 115–96
| Malone (45)
| Malone (17)
| Stockton (15)
| Delta Center19,911
| 58–22
|- align="center" bgcolor="#ccffcc"
| 82
| April 23, 19955:00p.m. MDT
| @ Houston
| W 103–97
| Malone (23)
| Malone (15)
| Malone, Stockton (8)
| The Summit16,611
| 60–22

Playoffs

|- align="center" bgcolor="#ccffcc"
| 1
| April 27, 19957:30p.m. MDT
| Houston
| W 102–100
| Stockton (28)
| Malone (14)
| Stockton (10)
| Delta Center19,911
| 1–0
|- align="center" bgcolor="#ffcccc"
| 2
| April 29, 19957:30p.m. MDT
| Houston
| L 126–140
| Malone (28)
| Malone (17)
| Sockton (12)
| Delta Center19,911
| 1–1
|- align="center" bgcolor="#ccffcc"
| 3
| May 3, 19957:30p.m. MDT
| @ Houston
| W 95–82
| Malone (32)
| Malone (19)
| Stockton (13)
| The Summit16,611
| 2–1
|- align="center" bgcolor="#ffcccc"
| 4
| May 5, 19957:30p.m. MDT
| @ Houston
| L 106–123
| Malone (31)
| Benoit (7)
| Stockton (11)
| The Summit16,611
| 2–2
|- align="center" bgcolor="#ffcccc"
| 5
| May 7, 19951:00p.m. MDT
| Houston
| L 91–95
| Malone (35)
| Malone (10)
| Hornacek (6)
| Delta Center19,911
| 2–3
|-

Player statistics

Season

Playoffs

Player Statistics Citation:

Awards and records
 Karl Malone, All-NBA First Team
 John Stockton, All-NBA First Team
 John Stockton, NBA All-Defensive Second Team

Transactions

References

Utah Jazz seasons
Utah
Utah
Utah